Felipe Benito Tromp (15 October 1917 – 12 August 1995) was the first governor of Aruba after Aruba received a status aparte within the Kingdom of the Netherlands. He worked as a teacher prior to becoming governor and served as Minister for Education in the Antilles (1958–1962). He took office as governor on 1 January 1986 and left office on 12 March 1992. He was succeeded by Olindo Koolman.

Biography
Felipe Tromp was born on 15 October 1917 in Aruba. After finishing his ULO (junior high school), he moved to the Netherlands for his teaching degree. In 1945, he returned to Aruba and started to work as a teacher. In 1949, he was first elected to the Estates of the Netherlands Antilles. On 17 October 1948, Tromp was one of the founding members of Aruba National Union (UNA).

Between 1951 and 1955, Tromp was elected to the Estates of Aruba, and participated in the round table conference about the future of the Netherlands Antilles. Between 1958 and 1962, he served as Minister of Education. In 1978, Tromp retired. On 1 January 1986, he was appointed as the first governor of Aruba and served until 1992.

Tromp died on Saturday 12 August 1995, at the age of 77.

Honours
Grand Cross of the Order of Orange-Nassau (12 March 1992)
An elementary school in Noord was named in his honour.

References 

1917 births
1995 deaths
Governors of Aruba
Government ministers of the Netherlands Antilles
Members of the Estates of the Netherlands Antilles
Members of the Estates of Aruba
Knights Grand Cross of the Order of Orange-Nassau